Windsor Heights may refer to a place in the United States:
 Windsor Heights, Iowa
 Windsor Heights, West Virginia